Anastasia Anatolyevna Panchenko (born 3 May 1990) is a Russian sprint canoeist who has competed since the late 2000s. At the 2010 ICF Canoe Sprint World Championships in Poznań, she won a bronze medal in the K-1 4 × 200 m event.

References
2010 ICF Canoe Sprint World Championships women's K-1 4 x 200 m results. – accessed 22 August 2010.

External links

Living people
Russian female canoeists
1990 births
Sportspeople from Omsk
ICF Canoe Sprint World Championships medalists in kayak
Canoeists at the 2019 European Games
European Games medalists in canoeing
European Games bronze medalists for Russia